Until the 17th century a bard would compose a poem knowing it was going to be sung. Poetry was called music of the tongue and string music was called music of the string ("Cerdd Dant"). The Welsh word "cerdd" can mean either poetry or music. When bardic music died out the knowledge of how the music was set also died out.

References

External links 

Music of the Robert ap Huw Manuscript
1 and 0 a compositional basis on Bragod website
Medieval Welsh Bardic Music, Interpreting the Robert ap Huw MS. by William Taylor

Welsh music history
Welsh literature
Welsh folk music
Medieval Wales